Boonesborough is an extinct town in Boone County, in the U.S. state of Missouri. Boonesborough was platted in 1836, and named after Daniel Boone. A post office called Boonesboro was established in 1839, and remained in operation until 1850.

References

Ghost towns in Missouri
Former populated places in Boone County, Missouri